The Geneva Film Festival is an annual event that takes place in Geneva, Illinois.  The festival shows films from around the world and puts on a workshop for those interested in the technical aspects of the film making process.

Official selections

2014

Narrative Shorts

 Crossings
 December
 Grey Route
 November Lights
 North Hollywood
 The Uncles (Gli Zii)
 My forest
 Masque
 Tess
 Sundays
 God's Got His Head in the Clouds
 One Safe / Directed by Gaetano Naccarato
 My forest / Directed by Sebastien Pins
 North Hollywood / Directed by Bob Stephenson
 Pain Staking / Directed by Adolfo Martinez Perez
 Scotty Works OUT / Directed by Dan Pal (People’s Choice Award for Best Narrative Short)
 You Will Find Me Within You

2013

Animated Shorts
 Light Me Up (Best Animated Short)

Documentary Feature
 Mayan Blue (Best Documentary Feature, Best Cinematography)
 Refuge: Stories of the Selfhelp Home (Emerging Documentary Filmmaker)

Documentary Shorts
 The Storykeeper (Best Documentary Short)

Narrative Feature
 Salt (Best Narrative Feature)
 The Employer (Emerging Feature Filmmaker)

Narrative Shorts
 A House, A Home (Best Narrative Short)

Student Shorts
 A Quest For Peace: Nonviolence Among Religions (Young Filmmaker Spotlight)
 Shoot the Moon (Student Visionary Award)

2012

Animated Shorts
 Secret Life of Objects - Outhouse
 Luna
 Being Bradford Dillman

Documentary Feature
 Wolves Unleashed
 Generation Baby Buster

Documentary Shorts
 The Trap of Saving Cambodia
 Mugs
 Dilli
 Carbon for Water

Narrative Feature
 Pearls of the Far East
 Tag und Nacht

Narrative Shorts
 Salvaging
 Parlay
 Kavinsky
 1848
 Amok
 All You Need is Love
 They Walk Among Us
 The World Turns
 The Runnder
 The Small Assassin
 Lifeless
 Hath No Man
 Deep Blue Breath
 Callum
 Buon Giorno Sayonara

2011

2010

2009

2008

2007

Notes and references 

Film festivals in Illinois
Geneva, Illinois